Eastham Airport was an airfield operational in the mid-20th century. The airfield was described as being located in a small field off Herring Brook Road in Eastham, Massachusetts.

References

Defunct airports in Massachusetts
Airports in Barnstable County, Massachusetts